Beito is a surname. Notable people with the surname include:

David T. Beito (born 1956), American historian and professor
Linda Royster Beito, American political scientist
Olav Beito (1901–1989), Norwegian linguist and professor

See also
Beto